Rajepur Nawada is a village in the East Champaran District of Bihar.

Geography
The city is close to Pakaridayal and is 15 km away, and Madhuban is 8 km away. The closest villages are Shekhpurva, Bokane Kala, Majhaulia, and Tharbetiya. The river Chaknaha flows nearby.

Climate
Climate is characterized by high temperatures and evenly distributed precipitation throughout the year. The Köppen Climate Classification sub-type for this climate is "Cfa" (Humid Subtropical Climate).

Demographics
 India census,
The Rajepur Nawada village has population of 8854 of which 4722 are males while 4132 are females.
 
In Rajepur Nawada village population of children with age 0-6 is 1795 which makes up 20.27% of total population of village. Average Sex Ratio of Rajepur Nawada village is 875 which is lower than Bihar state average of 918. Child Sex Ratio for the Rajepur Nawada as per census is 906, lower than Bihar average of 935.
 
Rajepur Nawada village has lower literacy rate compared to Bihar. In 2011, literacy rate of Rajepur Nawada village was 52.84% compared to 61.80% of Bihar. In Rajepur Nawada Male literacy stands at 60.98% while female literacy rate was 43.46%

Roadways
Rajepur Nawada is connected with Muzaffarpur, Motihari, and Kathmandu by National Highway 28 via Motihari. Bus services are available to Muzaffarpur, Motihari.

Education
Rajepur Nawada has many educational institutes including the following;

Government Institute
 R.M.V. and High School Rajepur Nawada, Nawada chowk
 Kanya Vidhayalaya, Near Panchayat Bhavan
 Primary School, Vishana Dai
 Primary School, Shivalay

Public Institution
 Nawada Central School

Villages in East Champaran district